is a resonant and binary trans-Neptunian object, approximately  in diameter, located in the outermost region of the Solar System. It was discovered on 27 March 2000, by astronomers John Kavelaars, Brett Gladman, Jean-Marc Petit and Matthew Holman at Mauna Kea Observatory on Hawaii. This distant object resides in an eccentric orbit and is locked in a 2:5 orbital resonance with Neptune. It is known to have a 111-kilometer sized companion, which was discovered in January 2007.

Orbit 

 has an extremely eccentric orbit which crosses the paths of many other trans-Neptunian objects, including almost all of the dwarf planets and dwarf planet candidates. As a result, its position alternates between the Kuiper belt and the scattered disc.

Resonance with Neptune 

 is part of a group of trans-Neptunian objects that orbit in a 2:5 resonance with Neptune. That means that for every five orbits that Neptune completes,  makes only two.

Satellite 

Like many objects of the Kuiper belt and scattered disc,  has a satellite. Provisionally designated S/2007 (60621) 1, the satellite was discovered by the Hubble Space Telescope seven years after  itself was found. It is thought to be 115 km in diameter, just 75.7% the diameter of 2000 FE8 itself.

Numbering 

This minor planet was numbered by the Minor Planet Center on 14 June 2003. , it has not been named.

References

External links 
  Canada-France Ecliptic Plane Survey (CFEPS)
 List Of Centaurs and Scattered-Disk Objects, Minor Planet Center
 

060621
Discoveries by John J. Kavelaars
Discoveries by Brett J. Gladman
Discoveries by Jean-Marc Petit
Discoveries by Matthew J. Holman
060621
20000327